= Miang noodles =

Thai noodle snack

Miang Noodles
- Type: Snack
- Place of origin: Central Thailand
- Region or state: Southeast Asia
- Main ingredients: Big flat noodles, grilled mackerel, eggs, roasted peanuts, dried shrimp, Chives leaves and bean sprouts

Miang Noodles (Thai: เมี่ยงก๋วยเตี๋ยว) is a snack or a snack that is wrapped around various fillings. This dish can be eaten in all seasons. Miang noodles in each village are similar but the taste of Miang sauce differs according to individual preferences. Originally miang was fermented tea leaves and sucking them was popular after eating or between meals. People thereafter invented and adapted Miang leaves to be noodle sheets, lotus petals and turnips to become various types of Miang, such as Miang Noodles, Vegetarian san choy bau and Lotus Petal Miang.
